Eritreans in Germany are citizens and residents of Germany who were born in Eritrea or are of Eritrean descent. As of 2020, there are 75,735 Eritreans living in Germany.

History
Interaction between Germany and the Horn of Africa dates back to at least the early 15th century; three Ethiopian monks, Petrus, Bartholomeus, and Antonius, are recorded as having been in Konstanz from 1416-1418, and participated in the Council of Constance. In the Late Middle Ages, the Kingdom of Ethiopia also controlled much of present-day Eritrea. Thus, it is possible that these monks originated in what is now Eritrea.

Since the outbreak of the Eritrean War of Independence, many Eritreans have fled their homes as refugees and asylum-seekers. During the war (1961-1991), an estimated 25,000 Eritreans sought refuge in Germany. Between 2013 and 2020, the Eritrean population in Germany grew from 11,655 to 75,735.

Eritrean supporters of the Eritrean People's Liberation Front had a strong presence in Germany. Eritrea Hilfswerk Deutschland is a German organization founded in 1976 which supported the EPLF's Eritrean Relief Association (which itself had a branch in Cologne). The Research and Information Centre on Eritrea, founded in London in 1979, had a branch in Germany as well.

Geographic distribution
As of 2020, most Eritrean nationals residing in Germany live in Hesse, North Rhine-Westphalia, and Bavaria. The following table lists German states by Eritrean population.

Notable people
Afrob
Joel Gerezgiher
Robert Glatzel
Nura (German rapper)

References

 
Germany